Kolomytsevo is a rural locality (a selo) and the administrative center of Kolomytsevskoye Rural Settlement, Krasnogvardeysky District, Belgorod Oblast, Russia. The population was 384 as of 2010. There are 3 streets.

Geography 
Kolomytsevo is located 17 km south of Biryuch (the district's administrative centre) by road. Kravtsov is the nearest rural locality.

References 

Rural localities in Krasnogvardeysky District, Belgorod Oblast